Tucker may refer to:

Places

United States
 Tucker, Arkansas
 Tucker, Georgia
 Tucker, Mississippi
 Tucker, Missouri
 Tucker, Utah, ghost town
 Tucker County, West Virginia

Outer space
 Tucker (crater), a small lunar impact crater in the southern part of the Mare Smythii

People
Tucker (given name), a page for people with the given name "Tucker"
Tucker (surname), a page for people with the last name "Tucker"
Tucker (American wrestler)
Tucker (Northern Irish wrestler)

Art, entertainment, and media

Fictional entities
Tucker, a Shetland pony in the film, Racing Stripes
Tucker Crowe, the fictional reclusive singer-songwriter in Nick Hornby's novel Juliet, Naked
Tucker Foley, one of the titular character's best friends on the animated series Danny Phantom
Tucker Jenkins, played by actor Todd Carty in the BBC television series Grange Hill and spin-off Tucker's Luck
Cameron Tucker, fictional character in the television series Modern Family
Tucker Williams, a.k.a. Mega Boy, from the film Zoom
Cale Tucker, the main protagonist of the 2000 animated sci-fi epic film Titan A.E.
Amos Tucker, fictional character portrayed by Tim Conway in the movie The Apple Dumpling Gang
Trip Tucker, fictional character on Star Trek: Enterprise
Lavernius Tucker, fictional character in the machinima science fiction comedy video series Red vs. Blue
Libby Tucker, the character played by Dinah Manoff in Neil Simon's play I Ought to Be in Pictures as well as the eponymous 1982 film
Malcolm Tucker, master of spin in Armando Iannucci's The Thick of It and In the Loop
Nina Tucker, fictional character in the TV series Neighbours
Tucker/Norm Phipps, a character in the 1998 movie There's Something About Mary
Tucker's, the club in the Black Mirror episode, "San Junipero", where Yorkie and Kelly first meet

Film and television
 Tucker: The Man and His Dream, film about Preston Tucker
 Tucker (2000 TV series), a 2000–2001 American television series that aired on NBC
 Tucker (2005 TV program), a 2005–2008 American television program, previously called The Situation with Tucker Carlson, hosted by Tucker Carlson that aired on MSNBC
 Tucker Carlson Tonight, the Fox News program currently hosted by Tucker Carlson
 Tucker's Luck, a British television series starring Todd Carty as Tucker that aired on BBC

Brands and enterprises
 Tucker 48, also nicknamed "Tucker Torpedo", a 1948 sedan automobile
 Tucker Sno-Cat, manufacturer of snowcats

Ships
 USS Henry W. Tucker, name of more than one United States Navy ship
 USS Tucker, name of more than one United States Navy ship

Other uses
 Tucker (dog), scat detection dog
 Tucker, a practitioner of fulling, a step in the processing of woolen cloth
 Bush tucker, Australian expression for food obtained from native plants and animals
 Tucker bag, tucker box, historically used by travelers in the Australian outback
 Tucker decomposition, mathematical decomposition for tensors
 Tuckerization, act of using a person's name in an original story as an in-joke

English masculine given names